Matías Ariel Fernández Fernández (born 15 May 1986) is a Chilean former professional footballer who played as an attacking midfielder. He was known for his dribbling skills, also being a free kick specialist.

After starting out at Colo-Colo, he spent several seasons with Villarreal, Sporting CP and Fiorentina, having moved to Europe in 2006. He also played professionally in Mexico and Colombia.

Fernández was elected South American Footballer of the Year in 2006, and also appeared for the Chile national team in the 2010 World Cup and three Copa América tournaments, winning the 2015 edition of the latter tournament.

Early life
Fernández was born in the Caballito neighbourhood in Buenos Aires to Argentine mother Mirtha and Chilean father Humberto. He moved to La Calera, Chile, at the age of 4.

Club career

Colo-Colo
Fernández began with the youth squads of Colo-Colo at the age of 12. His debut in the Primera División came on 1 August 2004 against Club Universidad de Chile, and a week later he scored his first two goals, against Cobresal.

Fernández would go on to net a total of eight goals in the 2004 Clausura, and was named best young player of the season. In the 2006 Apertura he helped his team capture their 24th title and, in December of the same year, he helped them reach the final of the Copa Sudamericana, lost to C.F. Pachuca of Mexico, by scoring nine times in six games for the tournament. He left on a high note, winning the 2006 Clausura tournament and the South American Footballer of the Year award.

Villarreal
In late October 2006, Fernández was signed by Spanish club Villarreal CF for a fee of €8.7 million, joining compatriot Manuel Pellegrini who was the coach. The transaction was made before he received the "South American Player of the Year" award and, despite reports that Real Madrid and Chelsea were also interested, he agreed to terms and arrived at the Valencia airport on 27 December; on 7 January 2007 he made his La Liga debut in a 0–1 home loss against Valencia CF, scoring his first competitive goal three months later in the 3–0 league win at Gimnàstic de Tarragona.

Despite having had a buyout clause of €50 million inserted in his contract, Fernández failed to achieve significant playing time during his first three seasons, but still contributed 30 matches and three goals in 2007–08 as the side finished a best-ever runners-up. On 10 May 2009, he scored from a penalty kick in a 3–3 away draw against eventual champions FC Barcelona.

Sporting CP
On 1 July 2009, after being deemed surplus to requirements by new Villarreal manager Ernesto Valverde, Fernández joined Sporting CP on a four-year contract, for €3.65 million, with a further €500,000 payable depending on appearances. Villarreal would retain 20% of the profit on any future sale of the player.

Fernández scored his first goal for his new team on 27 October 2009, in a 1–1 draw at Vitória de Guimarães, adding another the following week also in the Portuguese Primeira Liga, at home against C.S. Marítimo (again 1–1). In the UEFA Europa League he netted once more, in injury time of the Lions 3–0 victory over Everton in the round of 16 (4–2 on aggregate).

Fernández remained an important attacking unit in 2011–12, under both Domingos Paciência and his successor Ricardo Sá Pinto. He scored three of his four league goals against U.D. Leiria, two in the 3–1 home win and the game's only in the second match through a free kick in the 101st minute – the game had been interrupted for nine minutes due to floodlights malfunction.

Fiorentina
On 27 July 2012, Fernández transferred to Italian club ACF Fiorentina for about €3.1 million, plus €1.5 million bonuses. During his spell at the Stadio Artemio Franchi, he was consistently bothered by physical problems.

Fernández moved to fellow Serie A team A.C. Milan on 31 August 2016, on a season-long loan deal with an option to buy. He made his debut on 6 November, coming off the bench in the 2–1 away victory over U.S. Città di Palermo.

Later years
On 4 September 2017, free agent Fernández signed with Club Necaxa. On 4 February 2019 he joined Categoría Primera A defending champions Atlético Junior on a one-year contract, scoring a late equaliser on his debut 12 days later after coming on as a second-half substitute in the 1–1 home draw with Rionegro Águilas; he was named player of the match.

On 18 December 2019, Fernández returned to Colo-Colo by agreeing to a one-year deal with the option for a further season. The 36-year-old announced his retirement on 14 February 2023, after 11 months in the same league with Deportes La Serena.

International career
Fernández captained the Chile team at the 2005 FIFA World Youth Championship, scoring a goal in the 7–0 rout of Honduras. Despite a second-round exit to the Netherlands he displayed overall good football, playing alongside Nicolás Canales, Carlos Villanueva and José Pedro Fuenzalida.

Also a former under-17 international, Fernández quickly established as an integral part of the full side, netting five times and appearing for the nation at the 2007 Copa América. After featuring prominently in the 2010 FIFA World Cup qualification campaign, he was selected for the finals in South Africa, playing – and starting – in the group stage against Honduras and Switzerland (both 1–0 wins), in an eventual last-16 exit.

In May 2014, Fernández underwent an ankle surgery on his right foot, thus being unable to participate in that year's World Cup. He was included in the Chilean squad for the 2015 Copa América, being sent off in the opening match, a 2–0 win over Ecuador at the Estadio Nacional in Santiago; after having come as a 75th-minute substitute for Jorge Valdivia, he was one of four players on target in the final against Argentina, which ended 4–1 in a penalty shootout.

Fernández was initially named in the Copa América Centenario squad, but had to withdraw through injury and was replaced by Mark González as the nation again won the tournament.

Personal life
Fernández married his Chilean wife in March 2013, but the couple's first child had already been born in late 2008. He was fined for speeding when he was driving from Santiago to Viña del Mar, to witness the baby's birth.

Before moving to Europe, Fernández was often compared to compatriot David Pizarro, who spent most of his professional career in Italy.

Career statistics

Club

International goals

HonoursColo-ColoChilean Primera División: 2006 Apertura, 2006 Clausura
Copa Chile: 2019
Copa Sudamericana runner-up: 2006Sporting CPTaça de Portugal runner-up: 2011–12FiorentinaCoppa Italia runner-up: 2013–14MilanSupercoppa Italiana: 2016NecaxaCopa MX: Clausura 2018
Supercopa MX: 2018ChileCopa América: 2015Individual'
South American Footballer of the Year: 2006

References

External links

1986 births
Living people
Chilean people of Argentine descent
Citizens of Chile through descent
Naturalized citizens of Chile
Sportspeople of Argentine descent
Chilean footballers
Footballers from Buenos Aires
Association football midfielders
Chilean Primera División players
Colo-Colo footballers
Deportes La Serena footballers
La Liga players
Villarreal CF players
Primeira Liga players
Sporting CP footballers
Serie A players
ACF Fiorentina players
A.C. Milan players
Liga MX players
Club Necaxa footballers
Categoría Primera A players
Atlético Junior footballers
Chile under-20 international footballers
Chile international footballers
2007 Copa América players
2010 FIFA World Cup players
2011 Copa América players
2015 Copa América players
Copa América-winning players
Chilean expatriate footballers
Expatriate footballers in Spain
Expatriate footballers in Portugal
Expatriate footballers in Italy
Expatriate footballers in Mexico
Expatriate footballers in Colombia
Chilean expatriate sportspeople in Spain
Chilean expatriate sportspeople in Portugal
Chilean expatriate sportspeople in Italy
Chilean expatriate sportspeople in Mexico
Chilean expatriate sportspeople in Colombia
South American Footballer of the Year winners